Jari Viuhkola (born 27 February 1980) is a Finnish former professional ice hockey centre. He represented Kärpät in the Finnish SM-liiga. Viuhkolas career ended with season 2014-2015, after suffering from knee injuries. His last playing sessions he met with Mestis-team Kajaanin Hokki.

Playing career
After playing for Kärpät for his entire professional career to that date, Viuhkola signed a two-way contract with the New Jersey Devils in the 2007 offseason. After playing just one pre-season NHL game, Viuhkola was assigned to the Lowell Devils, New Jersey's AHL affiliate. After suffering a back injury and playing only ten games for Lowell, Viuhkola returned to Finland and signed a new contract with Kärpät.  He was winning the Finnish Championship on Liiga, in Finnish Kanada-malja in hockey season 2013-2014.Jari Viuhkola will have his playing number, #24 lifted up to Raksilas Oulu Energia-Areena roof.

Career statistics

International play
Viuhkola played for Team Finland in the 2007 IIHF World Championship. Viuhkola spent most of the tournament centering Team Finland's top line with Ville Peltonen and Jere Lehtinen, but played poorly and did not manage a single assist in the tournament.

International statistics

External links

1980 births
Chicago Blackhawks draft picks
Finnish ice hockey centres
Oulun Kärpät players
Living people
Lowell Devils players
Sportspeople from Oulu